MythTV is a free and open-source home entertainment application with a simplified "10-foot user interface" design for the living room TV. It turns a computer with the necessary hardware into a network streaming digital video recorder, a digital multimedia home entertainment system, or home theater personal computer. It can be considered a free and open-source alternative to TiVo or Windows Media Center. It runs on various operating systems, primarily Linux, macOS, and FreeBSD.

History
The MythTV project was started in April 2002 by Isaac Richards, who explained his motivation:

Features
 Pause, skip, and rewind live TV shows
 Completely automatic commercial detection and optional skipping
 Intelligently schedules recordings to avoid conflicts
 Interfaces with television listing sources such as XMLTV or PSIP
 Interfaces with nonprofit subscription listings service Schedules Direct in the United States and Canada. Schedules Direct delivers the same Tribune Media Services listings data that TiVo and other video recorders use.
 Supports ATSC, QAM, DMB-T/H and DVB (everything supported by LinuxTV) high-definition television
 Supports Xv, OpenGL, and VDPAU video output
 Supports H.264 codec
 Supports VP9 and H.265 codecs as of version 0.28
 A backend server and frontend client architecture, allowing multiple frontend client machines to be remotely served content from one or more backend servers. A single computer can perform as both the frontend client and the backend server.
 Plays recordings at an accelerated or decelerated rate, adjusting the audio pitch as necessary
 Schedule and administer various system functions using a web browser-based interface
 Controls a set-top box using an infrared remote (IR blaster), or Firewire

HDTV support
MythTV is capable of capturing HDTV streams from any source that will provide unencrypted video. This means broadcast ATSC and DVB content, as well as encrypted DVB content when using a tuner with an integrated CI module. Most U.S. cable and satellite providers use encrypted video only accessible through their own set-top boxes. Cable systems may provide some unencrypted QAM channels, but these will generally only be local broadcast stations, and not cable programming or premium channels.

OpenCable devices are available to access encrypted content on U.S. cable systems, but as this is a full DRM system, and not just CA like DVB CI, every piece of hardware and software on the playback chain must be tested and licensed by CableLabs. At current, Windows Media Center is the only DVR software to meet these requirements, and only it, and other software using its recording libraries, can use these devices. In 2010, CableLabs relaxed the DRM restrictions allowing unlicensed devices to record copy freely content using these devices, however it is still entirely up to cable operators what content they provide flagged as such.

As an alternative to direct digital capture, one can use an external decoder to receive the channels, and then capture using digital-analog-digital conversion (the analog hole). A popular means of doing this conversion is to connect the component outputs of a set-top box to the Hauppauge HD PVR.

Modules
MythTV's add-on modules (plugins) include:
 MythVideo plays various video file formats
 MythMusic a music player, jukebox, collection manager, and CD ripper
 MythGallery online photo gallery manager
 MythNews RSS feed news reader
 MythWeather fetches weather forecasts – including weather radar – from the Internet
 MythBrowser small web browser
 MythGame frontend for game console emulators
 MythWeb controls MythTV from a remote web browser
 MythArchive DVD burner
 MythNetvision streaming video player intended primarily for Flash-websites like YouTube
 MythZoneMinder frontend interface for a ZoneMinder system
 UPnP AV MediaServer v1.0 compliant server: share media files with UPnP-clients

The base system integrates with its modules. A system can be controlled with an infrared remote control using LIRC, or radio remote control using kernel modules.

Operating systems
MythTV is available for many operating systems based on Linux or Unix, including Mac OS. The MythTV website distributes only source code, which must be compiled for the desired system; executable programs can be downloaded from various third-party sources. The software runs on and is officially supported by Microsoft Windows, but  no official executable version was available; there are detailed instructions for compiling for Windows. All core frontend features work under Windows, including LiveTV, scheduling, and watching recordings, but most plugins do not work without additional patches.

Bundles
Notable projects that include a Linux distribution bundled with MythTV (and associated libraries) are:
 FreeBSD has several ports to support MythTV
 LinHES is a bootCD derivative of Arch Linux. Its MythTV frontend can be run from the CD. An entire installation to the hard disk can be made in minutes.
 LinuxMCE bundles MythTV with Kubuntu as the Linux distro, along with the Pluto Home automation suite.
 Mythbuntu combines Ubuntu distributions with MythTV. The Ubuntu community has built extensive resources for installing, configuring and troubleshooting MythTV. It was discontinued in 2016.
 Ubuntu TV integrates MythTV into a television-ready interface (based on the Ubuntu Unity user interface).
 Xebian is a distribution of Debian Linux for the Microsoft Xbox game console and includes MythTV.

See also

 Comparison of DVR software packages
 Home theater PC
 Infrared blaster
 List of free television software
 Schedules Direct
 Ubuntu TV

References

External links

 

Client/server media players
Free television software
macOS media players
Television placeshifting technology
Television technology
Television time shifting technology
Video recording software
Video software that uses Qt